Orkland is a former municipality in the old Sør-Trøndelag county, Norway. The municipality existed only for a short time, from 1920 until 1963. The  municipality encompassed the central part of what is now the municipality of Orkland in Trøndelag county. The main church of the municipality was Moe Church, just south of the village of Vormstad, the administrative centre of the municipality. Most of the population lived in the Orkdalen valley along the river Orklaelva and near the lake Hostovatnet. The main village areas were Vormstad, Svorkmo, and Hoston.

History
The municipality of Orkland was originally a part of the municipality of Orkdal (see formannskapsdistrikt), but on 1 July 1920 it was separated from Orkdal to form a new municipality of its own. Initially, it had a population of 1,760.

During the 1960s, there were many municipal mergers across Norway due to the work of the Schei Committee. On 1 January 1963, the municipalities of Orkland, Orkanger, Orkdal, and Geitastrand were merged to form a new, larger municipality of Orkdal. Prior to the merger, Orkland had a population of 1,707.

Name
The municipality is named after the Orkdalen valley. The first element is the genitive case of the name of the river  (now called Orklaelva).

Government
While it existed, this municipality was responsible for primary education (through 10th grade), outpatient health services, senior citizen services, unemployment, social services, zoning, economic development, and municipal roads. During its existence, this municipality was governed by a municipal council of elected representatives, which in turn elected a mayor.

Mayors
The mayors of Orkland:

 1920–1925: Ole T. Hongslo (V)
 1926–1928: Ingebrigt Bakken (V)
 1929–1934: Arnt Vormdal (V)
 1935–1937: Ole Holte (Bp)
 1938–1941: Arnt Vormdal (V)
 1941–1945: Ole O. Klingen (NS)
 1945–1945: Arnt Vormdal (V)
 1946–1959: Knut K. Holte (V)
 1960–1962: John Vormdal (V)

Municipal council
The municipal council  of Orkland was made up of representatives that were elected to four year terms. The party breakdown of the final municipal council was as follows:

See also
List of former municipalities of Norway

References

Orkland
Former municipalities of Norway
1920 establishments in Norway
1963 disestablishments in Norway